Eko Roni Saputra (born 2 May 1991) is an Indonesian mixed martial artist competing in the Flyweight division of ONE Championship. He trains out of Evolve MMA in Singapore.  

Saputra is also a former freestyle wrestler who has won bronze and silver medals at the Southeast Asian Games in 2009 and 2013. He has also competed in the 2018 Asian Games in Jakarta in the 57kg division.

Background 
Saputra grew up in poverty in Samarinda on the island of Borneo. His parents sold fish in the market and his father became a boxing coach after his fish-trading business went bankrupt. Hence he started training boxing when he was just 5 years old and at the age of 13 years old, he switched to wrestling because my father said there was a greater opportunity to become a national champion.

Saptura would win at the Southeast Asian Games, getting bronze at the 2009 Southeast Asian Games at 50 kg and silver at the 2013 Yangon at 55 kg. In 2018, he decided to transition to MMA and relocated to Singapore to pursue his new career, joining the Evolve MMA.

Mixed martial arts career

ONE Championship 

Saputra made his MMA debut against Niko Soe on 12 April 2019 at ONE Championship: Roots of Honor. He lost the bout via doctor stoppage in the first round.

In his sophomore performance, Saputra faced Kaji Ebin on 25 October 2019 at  ONE Championship: Dawn Of Valor. He won the bout in the first round due stoppage by the way of shoulder injury.

Saputra faced Khon Sichan at ONE Championship: Warrior's Code on 7 February 2020. He won the bout via rear-naked choke in the first round.

Saputra faced Murugan Silvarajoo at ONE Championship: Reign of Dynasties on 9 October 2020. He won the bout via keylock submission in the first round.

In a quick turnaround, Saputra faced Ramon Gonzalez at ONE Championship: Inside the Matrix 2 on 6 November 2020. He won the bout via rear-naked choke in the first round.

In his lone performance of 2021, Saputra faced Liu Peng Shuai at ONE Championship: Battleground 2 on 13 August 2021. He won the bout in ten seconds, knocking out Shuai in ten seconds.

Saputra was booked to face Chan Rothana at ONE: Lights Out on 11 March 2022. He won the fight by rear-naked choke in the first round.

Saputra faced Yodkaikaew Fairtex on October 21, 2022 at ONE 162. He won the fight by a heel hook in the first round. This win earned him the Performance of the Night award.

Saputra faced Danny Kingad on February 25, 2023, at ONE Fight Night 7. He lost the fight via unanimous decision.

Championships and accomplishments

Mixed martial arts
ONE Championship
Performance of the Night (One time)

Freestyle wrestling 
Southeast Asian Games 
2009 Southeast Asian Games Men's Freestyle 50 kg –  3rd place 
2013 Southeast Asian Games Men's Freestyle 55 kg –  2nd place

Mixed martial arts record

|-
|Loss
|align=center|7–2
|Danny Kingad
| Decision (unanimous)
|ONE Fight Night 7
|
|align=center| 3 
|align=center| 5:00
|Bangkok, Thailand
|
|-
| Win
|align=center|7–1
|Yodkaikaew Fairtex
| Submission (heel hook) 
|ONE 162
|
|align=center| 1
|align=center| 2:16
|Kuala Lumpur, Malaysia
|
|-
| Win
|align=center|6–1
| Chan Rothana
| Submission (rear-naked choke)
| ONE: Lights Out
| 
|align=center| 1
|align=center| 1:34 
| Kallang, Singapore
| 
|-
| Win
| align=center|5–1
| Liu Peng Shuai
| KO (punch)
| ONE Championship: Battleground 2
| 
| align=center| 1
| align=center| 0:10
| Kallang, Singapore
|
|-
| Win
| align=center| 4–1 
| Ramon Gonzalez
| Submission (rear-naked choke)
| ONE Championship: Inside the Matrix 2
| 
| align=center| 1 
| align=center| 4:07   
| Kallang, Singapore
|
|-
| Win
| align=center| 3–1
| Murugan Silvarajoo
| Submission (keylock) 
| ONE Championship: Reign of Dynasties
| 
| align=center| 1 
| align=center| 2:29  
| Kallang, Singapore
|
|-
| Win
| align=center| 2–1
| Khon Sichan
| Submission (rear-naked choke)
| ONE Championship: Warrior's Code
| 
| align=center| 1
| align=center| 3:45 
| Jakarta, Indonesia
| 
|-
| Win
| align=center| 1–1
| Kaji Ebin
| TKO (shoulder injury)
| ONE Championship: Dawn Of Valor
| 
| align=center| 1
| align=center| 0:19
| Jakarta, Indonesia
| 
|-
| Loss
| align=center| 0–1
| Niko Soe
| TKO (doctor stoppage) 
| ONE Championship: Roots of Honor
| 
| align=center| 1
| align=center| 3:03 
| Pasay, Philippines
| 
|-

See also
List of current ONE fighters

References

External links
 
 Eko Roni Saputra at ONE Championship

1991 births
Living people
Indonesian male sport wrestlers 
Indonesian male mixed martial artists 
Flyweight mixed martial artists
Mixed martial artists utilizing freestyle wrestling
Competitors at the 2009 Southeast Asian Games 
Competitors at the 2013 Southeast Asian Games 
Southeast Asian Games silver medalists for Indonesia
Southeast Asian Games bronze medalists for Indonesia
Wrestlers at the 2018 Asian Games
People from Samarinda
Southeast Asian Games medalists in wrestling